King of Hollywood may refer to:

 Douglas Fairbanks's nickname
 Clark Gable's nickname
 The King of Hollywood: The Story of Clark Gable, a 1962 book by Charles Samuels
 "King of Hollywood", a 1979 song by The Eagles from their album, The Long Run
 "King of Hollywood", a 2014 song by Withered Hand from New Gods

See also 
 Louis B. Mayer, King of Hollywood, a 1999 documentary film

King of Hollywood